Cham Kabud-e Vosta (also Romanized as Cham Kabūd-e Vosţá) is a village in Kuhdasht-e Jonubi Rural District, in the Central District of Kuhdasht County, Lorestan Province, Iran. At the 2006 census, its population was 33, in 5 families.

References 

Towns and villages in Kuhdasht County